The Palawan National School, or PNS (formerly Palawan National High School) is the flagship campus and the largest public high school in Puerto Princesa. It is currently located in Puerto Princesa City, Palawan with currently more than 10,000 students.

History 
In 1907, the Palawan High School was established in the town of Cuyo, in Palawan Province. This started as a Junior High School for the first two years of secondary education. The first building was composed of six rooms, which was made of light materials such as "pawid" and "sawali" (pawid was made of coconut leaves woven to make a roof and sawali is from small species of bamboo). But, there were a shortage of students, with only eight students in the first and second year. Because there were also a shortage of qualified teachers, the school ended up closing and reopening for the 1922-1923 school year.  

In 1924, the first graduation ceremony was held. During this ceremony, Dominador Arcinas was proclaimed Valedictorian and Pablo Nangit as the Salutatorian. They are considered as the best in their class of 1924. 

In 1936, Governor Heginio Mendoza made a directive on the transfer of the Palawan High School from the island municipality of Cuyo to the Municipality of Puerto Princesa, in the center of the province. The PHS temporarily used the old buildings of the Puerto Princesa Elementary School. Two years later, they added new classes to their curriculum, including Retail Merchandising, Horticulture, Woodworking, Sheet Metal Work, Poultry, Swine and Automotive.

When World War Two broke out, the school was temporarily closed. It was reopened during the liberation of the Philippines, in early 1945. During this time, Palawan High School was moved and temporarily housed in the recreation hall of Iwahig Penal Colony. After the liberation concluded, it was returned to the town of Puerto Princesa.

In 1947, it was transferred again, but to its now permanent place – a 9 hectare plot of land located at what is now known as Higenio Mendoza Sr. Street. At their new land, they constructed their first building – their main building. During the move, there were Quonset huts from the American Forces which was transferred during the time of former Governor of Palawan Alfredo M. Abueg, Sr.. As the years passed, due to the increase in the school population, new prefabricated buildings were constructed and replaced the old Quonset Huts from the American Forces.

In the year 1957, the General Curriculum used by the school was changed to a General 2–2 plan. Under this curriculum, students were permitted to choose their subjects. Students can take an academic course in preparation for the college course or they can take course intended only for vocational courses such as Retail Merchandising, Agriculture, Woodworking and Home Technology, when they reach their third year in high school.

In 1965, it was converted to a National High School under the principalship of Mr. Eugenio J. Dela Cuesta and was renamed to Palawan National High School.

During his time as the principal of Palawan National High School, Eugenio J. Dela Cuesta ordered new buildings to be constructed. This included the Science Complex, the roofed concrete stage, the Gaudencio Abordo Multi-purpose Center and the Athletic Complex. The latter is composed of 2 grandstand, concrete bleacher, control tower, swimming pool, a tennis court, volleyball and basketball court, and other facilities. In 1969, the Palawan National High School hosted the Southern Tagalog Athletic Association (STRAA) Meet.

In 1975, Due to economic crises, many of the students served as working students to sustain their studies. For this reason, Palawan National High School opened evening classes to accommodate those students who are working during day time and studying at night. There were only 132 students when evening classes were opened but later on there were an increase in their number.

In 1989, the Republic Act 6765, sponsored by the late Speaker of the House of Representatives, Speaker Ramon V. Mitra, and the former representative of second district of Palawan, Congressman David A. Ponce De Leon was passed. Under this law, schools on other parts of the Province of Palawan were integrated into one big school. These schools were Palawan National School, Puerto Princesa City School for Philippine Craftsmen, San Jose Barangay High School, Inagawan Barangay High School, Puerto Princesa Rural High School, Plaridel Barangay High School in the municipality of Aborlan, Palawan, Narra Barangay High School in Naraa, Palawan, Pulot Barangay High School in Brooke’s Point, Palawan, Bataraza High School in Bataraza, Palawan, and Balabac Barangay High School in Balabac, Palawan. According to the law, all schools included shall be called Palawan Integrated National Schools or PINS.

Today, Palawan National School is still catering to the education of all Palaweños, with the mission of continuous development of those who can contribute and can help not only the Province of Palawan likewise the country as a whole.

Mission and Vision

Mission 
A PNS that delivers quality education (formal, non-formal, informal) adoptable to the present environment manned by competent and committed teachers and personnel with the cooperation and understanding of parents and local and national officials and non-governmental organizations.

Vision 
The Palawan National School envisions every high school learner to be God–loving through experiencing wholesome atmosphere that develops them to be intellectually, morally, and physically prepared to the fast changing environments suited to maintain the needed ecological balance.

Educational Programs

Regular Class

Special Programs 
 Science, Technology and Engineering Program (STE)
 Special Program for Sports (SPS)
 Special Program for Arts (SPA)
 Special Program for Foreign Languages (SPFL)
 Special Education (SPED)
 Open High School

School Publications 
 The Palawenian
 Ang Palawenian
 Layog Palawenian

References

Schools in Puerto Princesa
Educational institutions established in 1907
High schools in the Philippines
1907 establishments in the Philippines